Uncial 0281 (in the Gregory-Aland numbering), is a Greek uncial manuscript of the New Testament. Palaeographically it has been assigned to the 7th or 8th century.

Description 
The codex contains a small parts of the Gospel of Matthew 6-27, on 47 parchment leaves (20 cm by 17 cm). The text is written in one column per page, 20 lines per page, in uncial letters. It is a palimpsest, the upper text contains part of the Old Testament.

Currently it is dated by the INTF to the 7th or 8th century.

Text 
The Greek text of the codex is a representative of the late Alexandrian text-type.

It agrees 18 times with Codex Sinaiticus and 12 times with Codex Vaticanus.

Location 
It is one of the manuscripts discovered in Saint Catherine's Monastery, Sinai in May 1975, during restoration work. Currently the codex is housed at the monastery (N.E. ΜΓ 29).

See also 
 List of New Testament uncials
 Biblical manuscript
 Textual criticism

References

Further reading

External links 

 Uncial 0281 at the Wieland Willker, "Textual Commentary" 2015. 

Greek New Testament uncials
7th-century biblical manuscripts
Palimpsests